Bong-4 is an electoral district for the elections to the House of Representatives of Liberia. The constituency covers Panta District, nine communities of Zota District (Gbansue Sulonmah, Shamkpallai, Belefana, Jarkai, Nyansue, Gbansue, Pelelei, Farvey and Yowee) and three communities of Sanoyea District (Gou, Laryea and Gbonota).

Elected representatives

References

Electoral districts in Liberia